Peter Chong (born John Kohnie Kuh, and sometimes credited as Goo Chong or Peter Chong Goe; December 2, 1898 – January 13, 1985) was a Chinese-American character actor who worked in Hollywood in the 1940s and 1950s.

Biography

Origins 
Chong was born in 1898 at Honolulu, Hawaii. He attended Oberlin College; he eventually earned a master's degree and a PhD.

Acting career 
He appeared in a number of Broadway productions and had a vaudeville act before going to Hollywood to work in film. When he arrived in Los Angeles, he was under contract at Warner Brothers. He also worked part-time as an interpreter for the Los Angeles Police Department. For much of his career, he was cast in Japanese, Indonesian, and Hawaiian roles — he didn't play a Chinese role until 1953.

Personal life 
He and his first wife, Ah He "Soo" Young, had a vaudeville act together. His second marriage was to Eileen Loh, a schoolteacher; they had a daughter together named Molly.

Partial filmography 

The Letter (1929) - Servant (uncredited)
Mission to Moscow (1943) - Japanese Ambassador Shigemitsu (uncredited)
Around the World (1943) - Mr. Wong (uncredited)
Up in Arms (1944) - Japanese Lieutenant (uncredited)
The Purple Heart (1944) - Mitsuru Toyama
Betrayal from the East (1945) - Capt. Yasuda (uncredited)
First Yank Into Tokyo (1945) - Dr. Kai Koon (uncredited)
The Beginning or the End (1947) - Japanese General (uncredited)
Intrigue (1947) - Editor
To the Ends of the Earth (1948) - Joe (uncredited)
Easter Parade (1948) - Sam - Don's Valet (uncredited)
On the Town (1949) - Bartender (uncredited)
The Reformer and the Redhead (1950) - Henry - Chinese Cook (uncredited)
Francis Goes to the Races (1951) - Wong, Travers' Servant (uncredited)
Smuggler's Gold (1951) - Boat Captain (uncredited)
Smuggler's Island (1951) - Cajo (uncredited)
Peking Express (1951) - Dining Car Steward (uncredited)
A Yank in Indo-China (1952) - General Wang
The World in His Arms (1952) - Wung Lo (uncredited)
Target Hong Kong (1953) - Mandarin (uncredited)
Remains to Be Seen (1953) - Ling Tan
South Sea Woman (1953) - Woo Ching (uncredited)
Torch Song (1953) - Peter
Forbidden (1953) - Dr. Sing (uncredited)
Miss Sadie Thompson (1953) - Chung (uncredited)
Hell and High Water (1954) - Japanese Eddy (uncredited)
The Left Hand of God (1955) - Fen Tso Lin - Merchant (uncredited)
Tribute to a Bad Man (1956) - Cooky
The Inn of the Sixth Happiness (1958) - Yang
This Earth Is Mine (1959) - Chu
The Mountain Road (1960) - Chinese Colonel

References 

1898 births
1985 deaths
American male film actors
Male actors from Jersey City, New Jersey
Oberlin College alumni
American male actors of Chinese descent